Francisco Javier Elorriaga Iturriagagoitia (born 3 December 1947) is a Spanish former professional cyclist. He competed in the individual road race at the 1972 Summer Olympics.

Major results

1971
 Mediterranean Games
1st Team time trial
1st Road race
1973
 1st GP Llodio
 1st Trofeo Masferrer
 1st Stage 3 Vuelta a Andalucía]
 1st Stage 3 Tour of the Basque Country
 1st Stage 2 Vuelta a Asturias
 3rd Overall Vuelta a Aragón
1st Stages 4 & 5
1974
 1st Overall Vuelta a Aragón
1st Stage 1
 1st Stages 3 & 4 Vuelta a Cantabria
 3rd GP Pascuas
 3rd Trofeo Masferrer
 3rd Overall Vuelta a Mallorca
1st Stage 6
1975
 1st Overall Vuelta a La Rioja
1st Stage 1
 1st Stage 5 Vuelta a Asturias
 2nd Trofeo Masferrer
 2nd National Road Race Championships
1976
 1st Overall Vuelta a Aragón
1st Stages 2, 4 & 7
 1st Stages 2 & 4 Tour of the Basque Country
 1st Stage 4 Vuelta a Cantabria
 2nd GP Nuestra Senora de Oro
 2nd Overall Tour of the Basque Country
 2nd Klasika Primavera
 2nd Trofeo Elola
 3rd GP Pascuas
 3rd Overall Tres Días de Leganés
1977
 1st Overall Tres Días de Leganés
 1st Prologue Tour of the Basque Country
 1st Stage 1 Vuelta a Asturias
 1st Stage 3 Vuelta a Cantabria
 1st GP Caboalles de Abajo
 3rd GP Navarra
1978
 1st Trofeo Luis Puig
 1st Stage 11 Vuelta a España
 1st Prologue and Stage 2 Vuelta a Asturias
 1st Stage 3 Vuelta a Cantabria
 1st GP Valencia
 2nd GP Navarra
 3rd Overall Tres Días de Leganés
 3rd GP Pascuas
1980
 1st Stage 15 Vuelta a España
 3rd National Road Race Championships

References

External links
 

1947 births
Living people
Spanish male cyclists
Olympic cyclists of Spain
Cyclists at the 1972 Summer Olympics
People from Abadiño
Spanish Vuelta a España stage winners
Mediterranean Games medalists in cycling
Mediterranean Games gold medalists for Spain
Competitors at the 1971 Mediterranean Games
Sportspeople from Biscay
Cyclists from the Basque Country (autonomous community)